Nancy Joan Guild (October 11, 1925 – August 16, 1999) was an American film actress of the 1940s and 1950s. She appeared in Somewhere in the Night (1946), The Brasher Doubloon (1947), and the comedy Abbott and Costello Meet the Invisible Man (1951). Although appearing in major films, Guild never achieved as much fame at 20th Century Fox, the studio that had signed her to a seven-year contract, as she had hoped, and eventually stopped acting.

Career
Guild was a freshman at the University of Arizona when a photographer at Life magazine noticed her. After her picture was published in a spread on campus fashions, Guild received screen tests at five Hollywood studios, and she was signed by 20th Century Fox. The studio's publicity writers declared "Guild rhymes with wild!" when hyping her in Somewhere in the Night, her first film, directed by Joseph L. Mankiewicz.

On the rebound from an engagement with producer Edward Lasker, Guild married fellow Fox contract player Charles Russell in 1947. The following year, they appeared together in the  musical Give My Regards to Broadway (1948). They had a daughter, Elizabeth, in 1949. 

She left Fox and appeared in movies as a freelance and as a contract star at Universal-International, where she appeared in Little Egypt, Abbott and Costello Meet the Invisible Man picture and the Francis the Talking Mule movie Francis Covers the Big Town (1953), her last picture.

Guild was a panelist on the DuMont network's Where Was I?, a game show, in 1952-1953. She appeared occasionally on television and briefly returned to the movies in Otto Preminger's Such Good Friends (1971).

Personal life
On August 16, 1951, Guild married Broadway impresario Ernest H. Martin. In 1975, she divorced Martin and married photojournalist John Bryson in 1978. She divorced Bryson in 1995.

Death
On August 16, 1999, Guild died of emphysema in East Hampton, New York at the age of 73.

Filmography

References

External links 
 

American film actresses
University of Arizona alumni
1925 births
1999 deaths
20th Century Studios contract players
20th-century American actresses
Actresses from Los Angeles